North-Eastern Rhodesia was a British protectorate in south central Africa formed in 1900. The protectorate was administered under charter by the British South Africa Company. It was one of what were colloquially referred to as the three Rhodesian protectorates, the other two being Southern Rhodesia and Barotseland-North-Western Rhodesia. It was amalgamated with Barotseland-North-Western Rhodesia, another territory administered by the British South Africa Company, to form Northern Rhodesia in 1911.

History
The colonisation of the region that would become North-Eastern Rhodesia began in 1890. Joseph Thompson was dispatched by Cecil Rhodes of the British South Africa Company to negotiate agreements with African chiefs. Alfred Sharpe was similarly dispatched by the British Consul for Nyasaland for the same purpose. After failing to secure any agreements, Sharpe and Thompson used force to subdue the local people. In 1895 the British South Africa Company was granted land and mineral rights over 10,000 square miles by Mozambique Gold, Land and Concession Company, a company it had bought in 1893. In order to better exploit the anticipated mineral wealth, the British South Africa Company incorporated a subsidiary, North Charterland Exploration Company in 1895. Effective administration of the region was achieved by the end of 1899.

In January 1900 Queen Victoria signed the  North-Eastern Rhodesia Order in Council, 1900. This Order made official the name North-Eastern Rhodesia and formally proclaimed it a British protectorate. Under the Order a regime for the Company's governance of the new protectorate was established. The new protectorate was administered by an Administrator appointed by the High Commissioner for South Africa. The High Commissioner legislated by proclamation for the protectorate. The protectorate was divided into seven administrative districts.

In 1900 Robert Edward Codrington  was appointed as the first Administrator. He held this post until 1907. The last person to serve as Administrator was Lawrence Aubrey Wallace from 1907 until 1909 after which the position was left vacant. The capital was at Fort Jameson, today called Chipata.

When the protectorate was amalgamated with Barotseland-North-Western Rhodesia to form Northern Rhodesia, the Administrator of Northern Rhodesia took over the functions that had been carried out by the Administrator of North-Eastern Rhodesia.

Laws
The laws of England applied to the protectorate, as far as local circumstances permitted. In civil cases between natives, native laws applied so far as was not repugnant to natural justice, or morality, or to any Order in Council, or any regulation thereunder. The Protectorate had a High Court, District Courts and Magistrates' Courts. Appeals from the Protectorate Courts could be made to the Supreme Court of Cape Colony and from there to the Privy Council in the United Kingdom.

See also
 British South Africa Company
 Company rule in Rhodesia
 Rhodesia (name)
 Northern Rhodesia
 Barotseland-North-Western Rhodesia
 Sir Robert Codrington, Administrator, 1900–1907
 North-Eastern Rhodesia Gazette
 Rhodesia (disambiguation) for dates of the various territories
 Northern Rhodesia

References

 
Northern Rhodesia
British South Africa Company
Former British colonies and protectorates in Africa
History of Rhodesia
History of Zambia
States and territories established in 1900
States and territories disestablished in 1911
1911 disestablishments in Africa
1900 establishments in the British Empire
1911 disestablishments in the British Empire